Speedway may refer to:

Racing

Race tracks
Edmonton International Speedway, also known as Speedway Park, a former motor raceway in Edmonton, Alberta
Indianapolis Motor Speedway, a motor raceway in Speedway, Indiana

Types of races and race courses
Cycle speedway, a form of bicycle racing
Dirt track racing, known as speedway in Australia and New Zealand
Motorcycle speedway, a form of motorcycle sport
Oval track racing, motor racing on an oval track which turns in one direction 
Sidecar speedway, a form of sidecar racing

Geography 
Speedway, Indiana, a town in Marion County, Indiana, home of the Indianapolis Motor Speedway
Speedway, West Virginia, an unincorporated community in Mercer County

Arts, entertainment, and media 
Speedway (1929 film), a silent film
Speedway (1968 film), a film starring Elvis Presley and Nancy Sinatra
Speedway (soundtrack), 1968
"Speedway" (song), a song by Elvis Presley
Speedway (band), a Scottish band who entered the UK charts in 2003
Speedway, a 1969 racing electro-mechanical game by Chicago Coin

Other uses
Speedway (store), a chain of gas stations

, a United States Navy patrol boat in commission from 1917 to 1919
A brand of the Gas Engine & Power Company & Charles L. Seabury Company